The 1958–59 season was the 51st year of football played by Dundee United, and covers the period from 1 July 1958 to 30 June 1959. United finished in seventeenth place in the Second Division.

Match results
Dundee United played a total of 46 competitive matches during the 1958–59 season.

Legend

All results are written with Dundee United's score first.
Own goals in italics

Second Division

Scottish Cup

League Cup

See also
 1958–59 in Scottish football

References

Dundee United F.C. seasons
Dundee United